The Grand Knockout Tournament (also known as It's a Royal Knockout) was a one-off charity event which took place on 15 June 1987, and was shown on British television on 19 June 1987 (BBC1, repeated on 27 December 1987), in addition to airing on American TV via the USA Network on 12 August 1987, and European satellite channel Superchannel on 6 March 1988 (repeated on Christmas Day 1988). It followed the format of It's a Knockout (the British version of Jeux sans frontières), a slapstick TV gameshow which was broadcast in the UK until 1982.

The event was staged on the lakeside lawn of the Alton Towers stately home and theme park. However, the event used its own specially created immersing set, meaning that the location was not very recognisable in the TV broadcast.

Although regarded as a failure, a similar show, without royal involvement was made the following year at Walt Disney World in Florida, featuring teams of celebrities representing the United Kingdom, USA, and Australia.

Synopsis 

The show featured members of the British royal family alongside various sporting and showbiz celebrities. The celebrity participants were drawn from the realms of music, sport, television, comedy and film:

Team One 
Prince Edward's team, on behalf of the Duke of Edinburgh Award:
Toyah Willcox
Barry McGuigan
Christopher Reeve
Steve Cram
Charles Bronson
Tessa Sanderson
Sarah Hardcastle
John Cleese
Michael Ball
Nicholas Lyndhurst
Dame Kiri Te Kanawa
Duncan Goodhew
Sharon McPeake

Team Two 
The Princess Royal's team, on behalf of Save the Children:
Debbie Flintoff
Cliff Richard
Emlyn Hughes
Jenny Agutter
Kevin Kline
Jackie Stewart
Eddy Grant
Bill Wyman
Peter Blake
Walter Payton
Virginia Leng
Sunil Gavaskar
Anthony Andrews
Tom Jones
Sheena Easton

Team Three 
The Duke of York's team, on behalf of the World Wildlife Fund:
Judy Simpson
Anneka Rice
Fiona Fullerton
Gary Lineker
George Lazenby
Michael Palin
Nigel Mansell
John Travolta
Griff Rhys Jones
Margot Kidder
Steve Podborski

Team Four 
The Duchess of York's team, on behalf of International Year of Shelter for the Homeless, 1987:
All members of Frankie Goes To Hollywood
Meat Loaf
Pamela Stephenson
Brian Cooper, dog-sledder
Mel Smith
Jane Seymour
Chris de Burgh
Viv Richards
Paul McCartney
Michael Brandon
Jimmy Page
John Mills

The show was conceived and organised by Prince Edward, who had been keen to develop a career in TV and theatre after he left the Royal Marines. The show featured Prince Edward, the Princess Royal and the Duke and Duchess of York as non-participating team captains, each of whom supported a different charity. The show was hosted by Stuart Hall, Les Dawson and Su Pollard, with Hal Linden providing commentary for the U.S. telecast. Paul Daniels and Geoff Capes were timekeepers. Aled Jones, Rowan Atkinson and Barbara Windsor were heralds of the tournament. The Duke of Abercorn, the Duke of Westminster, the Duke of Gloucester and the Duke of Roxburghe acted as impartial judges for each of the four teams.

The contestants competed in numerous games; for example, in one round, the players dressed up as giant vegetables, while in another they threw fake hams at each other. Live coverage was broadcast on BBC Radio 1 on 15 June 1987, and was presented by Steve Wright (The Radio 1 Roadshow).

The tournament was won by the Princess Royal's team, with the Duke of York's team second, Prince Edward's team third, and the Duchess of York's team finishing last.

Aftermath 

Immediately after the event, Prince Edward asked the assembled journalists, "Well, what did you think?" The journalists, unbeknownst to Prince Edward, hadn't seen the event as they remained in the press tent, separate from the celebrities and members of the Royal Family who had taken part, and were apparently unhappy at such an arrangement. They responded with nervous laughter and Prince Edward stormed out of the press conference, sarcastically thanking the journalists for their enthusiasm.

Reportedly the Queen disapproved of the event and all of her courtiers had advised against it. Neither she, the Duke of Edinburgh nor the Prince and Princess of Wales agreed to take part, but Edward persevered and the project went to completion. Nonetheless, the event drew an audience of 18 million domestically, making it the fourth most-watched programme of the year. It was later watched by 400 million viewers worldwide and raised over £1.5 million for the respective charities.

References

External links

Knockout – The Grand Charity Tournament (the book of the event) 

Alton Towers
1987 television specials
BBC television game shows
British royal family
1987 in British television
Charity events in the United Kingdom